The year 670 BC was a year of the pre-Julian Roman calendar. In the Roman Empire, it was known as year 84 Ab urbe condita . The denomination 670 BC for this year has been used since the early medieval period, when the Anno Domini calendar era became the prevalent method in Europe for naming years.

Events
 King Gyges of Lydia mints the first Greek coins.
 Miletus begins establishing colonies in the Black Sea and Mediterranean Sea.
 Metallurgy was invented

Births

Deaths

References

670s BC